The Samuel Bartley Holleman House is a historic home located in New Hill, North Carolina, an unincorporated community in southwestern Wake County. Constructed in 1913, the -story building is an example of Queen Anne and Colonial Revival architecture. Other buildings on the property include a wellhouse, pumphouse, engine house, smokehouse, and wash house.

In January 2008, the Samuel Bartley Holleman House was listed on the National Register of Historic Places.

See also
 List of Registered Historic Places in North Carolina

References

Houses on the National Register of Historic Places in North Carolina
Houses completed in 1913
Colonial Revival architecture in North Carolina
Queen Anne architecture in North Carolina
Houses in Wake County, North Carolina
National Register of Historic Places in Wake County, North Carolina
1913 establishments in North Carolina